The Montpellier 1 University (Université Montpellier 1) is a French university, in the Academy of Montpellier. It is one of the three successor universities to the University of Montpellier following the split in 1970.

In January 2015, Montpellier 2 University and Montpellier 1 University merged again to reform University of Montpellier.

References

See also

 University of Montpellier
 List of public universities in France by academy
 List of split up universities

University of Montpellier
Educational institutions established in 1970
1970 establishments in France
Universities and colleges in Montpellier